CSAO may refer to:

Companies
Conrail Shared Assets Operations, an American railroad company

Organisations
Club du Sahel et de l’Afrique de l’Ouest, a development organization from the Sahel.